This comparison of wiki hosting services or wiki farms is not comprehensive, it details only those 'notable' enough (in Wikipedia terms) to be included. A useful comprehensive comparison of wiki farms can be found on MediaWiki's site, at mw:Hosting services.

Online services which host wiki-style editable web pages. General characteristics of cost, presence of advertising, licensing are compared, as are technical differences in editing, features, wiki engine, multilingual support and syntax support.

Table of services
This table compares general information for several of the more than 100 wiki hosting services that exist.

All the mentioned services have WYSIWYG editing.

Deprecated wiki hosts 
This section is for hosts that were previously in the list above but no longer are up and running.

 Wikispaces

See also 
 Collaborative real-time editor
 Collaborative software
 Comparison of wiki software
 List of collaborative software
 List of wiki software
 List of wikis
 Wiki software

Notes

References

External links 
mw:Hosting services. Much longer list of MediaWiki-based wiki farms and hosting services. It is longer because each host does not have to meet the notability requirements of Wikipedia articles. 
 
 Wikimatrix, with interactive selection of wikihosting services based on user preference
 Farms on WikiApiary List of MediaWiki-powered wiki farms with various statistics.
 Category:WikiFarm at WikiIndex.
 WikiFarms - wikiteam - tools for archiving wikis.

Wiki farms
Technology-related lists